Brad Meltzer (born April 1, 1970) is an American novelist, non-fiction writer, TV show creator, and comic book author. His novels touch on the political thriller, legal thriller and conspiracy fiction genres, while he has also written superhero fiction for DC Comics and a series of short biographies of prominent people for young readers.

Early life
In 1993, Meltzer lived in Beacon Hill, Boston, Massachusetts with roommate, fellow comic book writer/artist Judd Winick, working in sales at Games magazine by day while working on his first novel by night. Afterwards Meltzer graduated from Columbia Law School, and was selected to the Columbia Law Review.

Career

Meltzer's books have appeared on the bestseller lists for fiction, non-fiction (History Decoded), advice (Heroes for My Son and Heroes for My Daughter), children's books (I Am Amelia Earhart and I Am Abraham Lincoln), and comic books (Justice League of America), for which he won the Eisner Award.

Meltzer is also responsible for helping find the missing 9/11 flag that the firefighters raised at Ground Zero at the World Trade Center site, making national news on the 15th anniversary of 9/11. Using his TV show, Brad Meltzer's Lost History, he told the story of the missing flag and asked Americans for their help in returning it. Four days later, a former Marine walked into a fire station in Everett, Washington, said that he saw Meltzer's TV show, and that he now wanted to return the flag. Meltzer unveiled the flag at the National September 11 Memorial & Museum in New York, where it is now on display.

Known for his thorough research, Meltzer counts former Presidents Bill Clinton and George H.W. Bush as fans, and both have helped him with his research.  During Brad's research, Bush gave Brad the secret letter he left for President Bill Clinton in the Oval Office desk.

In September 2006, Meltzer participated in a work group with the CIA, the FBI, various psychologists, and Department of Homeland Security intelligence staff to brainstorm new ways that terrorists might attack the U.S.

As an inspirational speaker, Meltzer's TEDx Talk, "How to Write Your Own Obituary", has been viewed over 50,000 times, and prompted TED to ask him to do another TED Talk: "Write Your Story, Change History", which has been viewed over 80,000 times.

Meltzer helped preserve the house where Superman was created in Cleveland, Ohio, helping to create the Siegel & Shuster Society, then telling the story of the house and running an auction that raised over $100,000.

Meltzer has worked with numerous organizations throughout Florida to promote literacy within the State. Meltzer has worked in the past with Florida Family Literacy Initiative, and is due to participate in the Literacy Coalition of Palm Beach County's 23rd Annual Love of Literacy Luncheon in March 2014.

Meltzer was one of four authors selected to entertain at Barbara Bush's 90th birthday party in 2015.

Meltzer aided in helping save the life of his 11th grade history teacher. When his teacher told Meltzer she was sick and needed a new kidney, Meltzer asked his 100,000 Facebook fans to find her a new kidney and in the process, helped find a donor.

During Star Wars Night at the 2015 Marlins/Mets baseball game, Meltzer threw out the first pitch of the game, then proceeded to fight mascot Billy the Marlin in a lightsaber battle.

Novels
His first novel, Fraternity, garnered 24 rejection letters, but he then sold his second novel, The Tenth Justice, while in law school. In 1994, he co-wrote the original swearing-in oath that is taken by AmeriCorps members, and has been delivered by Presidents Bill Clinton and George W. Bush. In 1996, Meltzer created one of the earliest author websites for his first published novel, The Tenth Justice. Over the years, every one of Meltzer's thrillers has made The New York Times bestseller list and The Hollywood Reporter has listed him as one of "Hollywood's Most Powerful Authors".

While Meltzer was conducting research for his 2011 novel The Inner Circle, former U.S. President George H. W. Bush gave him a copy of the secret letter that he had left in the Oval Office desk for Bill Clinton.

His popular “Culper Ring” novels, of which The President's Shadow is the third, imagine that a secret spy ring, founded in real life by George Washington, continues to exist today. His 2013 novel, The Fifth Assassin, follows a killer bent on re-creating the crimes of presidential assassinations from John Wilkes Booth to Lee Harvey Oswald.

Meltzer's 2018 novel The Escape Artist debuted at No. 1 on The New York Times Hardcover Fiction Bestseller list.

Non-fiction
In May 2010, Meltzer released his first nonfiction book, Heroes For My Son, a book he had worked on for almost a decade, beginning on the night his first son was born. The book is part of a two-book deal with Meltzer's publisher. He stated in a May 2010 interview that he was working on Heroes for My Daughter. The book is a collection of stories from the lives of 52 people such as Jim Henson, Rosa Parks and Mr. Rogers, and was written with the intention of being presented one day to his then-eight-year-old son. It debuted at #2 on The New York Times Best Seller list. Heroes for My Daughter also made The New York Times bestseller list.

In January 2014, Meltzer and artist Chris Eliopoulos launched a line of biographies for kids, starting with I Am Amelia Earhart and I Am Abraham Lincoln, which debuted on The New York Times bestseller list. The books are part of a series, Ordinary People Change the World, whose books tell the stories of America's icons in an entertaining way to engage young readers. He followed the initial books with I Am Albert Einstein, I Am Rosa Parks, I Am Lucille Ball, I Am Jackie Robinson, I Am Helen Keller, I Am Martin Luther King, Jr., I Am Jane Goodall, I Am George Washington and I Am Jim Henson. Then in October 2017, I Am Gandhi and I Am Sacagawea were released. In October 2018, PBS announced an animated adaptation of the series called Xavier Riddle and the Secret Museum, which debuted in November 2019.

In January 2019, Meltzer released The First Conspiracy: The Secret Plot to Kill George Washington, cowritten with Josh Mensch.

In May 2020, Meltzer and his co-author Josh Mensch released The Lincoln Conspiracy: The Secret Plot to Kill America's 16th President—and Why It Failed, which covers the foiled plot to kill Lincoln in 1861.

Comic books

Meltzer followed director Kevin Smith's run on DC Comics' Green Arrow and created a six-issue story arc for DC Comics' Green Arrow #16–21 (October 2002 – April 2003).

In 2004 he wrote the miniseries Identity Crisis, which became one of the most controversial storylines of the decade, one of the top selling books of that decade, and also one of the most popular. It regularly makes the list of DC Comics' "best comics", "best moments", and even "best fights", praised by The New York Times and director Joss Whedon. While the miniseries holds an average score of 7.3 out of 10 at the review aggregator website Comic Book Roundup, (the lowest issue score going to issue #7, with 5.3, and the highest going to issue #1, with 8.7), it was criticized for its use of sexual violence as a plot device, for retconning events in DC continuity that critics and readers felt harmed the characterization of long-standing DC heroes, and for influencing similar subsequent comics.

Meltzer was one of many writers and artists who contributed to Superman/Batman #26 (June 2006), a tribute book dedicated to Sam Loeb, the son of writer Jeph Loeb, who died of cancer in 2005 at the age of 17. Meltzer scripted pages 11–12 and 19 of the comic book.

Meltzer took over the writing duties for a 13-issue stint on the new monthly Justice League of America series, which started with issue #0 on July 19, 2006, and issue #1 following a month later. Meltzer and artist Gene Ha received the 2008 Eisner Award for Best Single Issue (or One-Shot) for their work on issue #11 of the series. The award was presented by Samuel L. Jackson and Gabriel Macht.

In 2008, it was announced that Meltzer would write an arc of Joss Whedon's Buffy the Vampire Slayer Season Eight comic book for Dark Horse Comics. Whedon would later appear as himself, alongside Brian K. Vaughan and Damon Lindelof in the trailer for Meltzer's 2008 release of The Book of Lies. Whedon, Vaughan and Lindelof portray themselves as conspiracy theorists who believe in a so-called "Book of Lies" which, in Meltzer's novel, connects the original murder story (Cain and Abel) to the murder of Jerry Siegel's father, shortly before the conception of the iconic Superman character. In 2010, Meltzer wrote #32–35 of Buffy the Vampire Slayer Season Eight.

In January 2014 Meltzer and artist Bryan Hitch collaborated on a retelling of Batman's first appearance for Detective Comics (vol. 2) #27. Meltzer and artist John Cassaday crafted the "Faster Than a Speeding Bullet" chapter in Action Comics #1000 (June 2018).

Television
Meltzer was the co-creator of the television series Jack & Bobby, which ran for one season (2004–2005) on the WB television network.

Meltzer hosted the History series Brad Meltzer's Decoded, which aired from December 2, 2010 to January 20, 2012.

On October 31, 2014, Brad Meltzer's Lost History premiered on History's H2 network, with Meltzer hosting. Each episode of Lost History presents both solved and unsolved cases and success stories where Americans have helped find missing historic objects such as the Ground Zero flag from 9/11 and the original Wright Brothers flying machine patent. Viewers are encouraged to submit tips to an online site, in an effort to provide key information leading to the return of these treasures. In September 2016, Meltzer hosted America's 9/11 Flag: Rose from the Ashes, which recounts how Lost History located and authenticated the missing 9/11 flag.

Personal life
Meltzer lives in Florida with his wife, an attorney. He has two sons and a daughter. Brad is Jewish according to his verified Twitter.

Bibliography

Novels

Comics

DC Comics
Green Arrow vol. 3 #16–21 (with Phil Hester, 2002–2003) collected as Green Arrow: The Archer's Quest (hc, 176 pages, 2003, ; tpb, 2004)
Identity Crisis #1–7 (with Rags Morales, 2004–2005) collected as Identity Crisis (hc, 288 pages, 2005, ; tpb, 2006, ; Absolute Edition, 2011)
Superman/Batman #26 (with Ian Churchill and Carlos Pacheco, two short sequences among other writers and artists, 2006) collected in Superman/Batman Volume 2 (tpb, 336 pages, 2014)
Justice League of America vol. 2 (with Ed Benes, Shane Davis (#8), Gene Ha (#11) and Eric Wight (#12), 2006–2007) collected as:
The Tornado's Path (collects #1–7, hc, 224 pages, 2007, ; tpb, 2008)
The Lightning Saga (collects #0 and 8–12, hc, 224 pages, 2008, ; tpb, 2009)
Justice League of America by Brad Meltzer (collects #0–12, hc, 470 pages, 2020)
DC Universe: Last Will and Testament (with Adam Kubert, one-shot, 2008) collected in Final Crisis Omnibus (hc, 1,512 pages, 2018)
Batman:
Detective Comics vol. 2 #27: "The Case of the Chemical Syndicate" (with Bryan Hitch, co-feature, 2014) collected in Batman: Detective Comics — Gothopia (hc, 208 pages, 2014, ; tpb, 2015)
DC 100-Page Comic Giant: Our Fighting Forces: "Medal of Honor" (co-written by Meltzer and Salvatore Giunta, art by Jim Lee, co-feature in one-shot, 2020)
Action Comics #1000: "Faster Than a Speeding Bullet" (with John Cassaday, co-feature, 2018)

Other publishers
Buffy the Vampire Slayer Season Eight #32–35: "Twilight" (with Georges Jeanty, Dark Horse, 2010) collected in Buffy the Vampire Slayer Season Eight Volume 4 (hc, 320 pages, 2013)
Aw Yeah Comics! #2: "The Best Fight Ever!" (co-written by Meltzer and his son Theo, art by Franco Aureliani, co-feature, Aw Yeah, 2013) collected in Aw Yeah Comics! And... Action! (tpb, 152 pages, Dark Horse, 2014)
Love is Love (untitled one-page story, with Chris Eliopoulos, anthology graphic novel, 144 pages, IDW Publishing, 2016)
Marvel Comics #1000: "We're Calling Him Ben" (with Julian Totino Tedesco, anthology, Marvel, 2019) collected in Marvel Comics 1000 (hc, 144 pages, 2020)

Non-fiction

Children's books

References

External links

 
 
 Fantastic Fiction Author Page
 
 Brad Meltzer's Decoded — History.com
 Interview with Brad Meltzer on The Sound of Young America: MP3 Link
 BlogTalkRadio interview with Rodger Nichols 2018 (Escape Artist)

 
1970 births
20th-century American novelists
21st-century American novelists
American comics writers
American male novelists
Columbia Law School alumni
Jewish American novelists
Living people
Novelists from Florida
Novelists from New York (state)
University of Michigan alumni
Writers from Brooklyn
People from Beacon Hill, Boston
20th-century American male writers
21st-century American male writers